Litholingia is an extinct genus of lacewing insect which existed in what is now China during the Middle Jurassic period. It contains the species L. ptesa, L. rhora, L. eumorpha, and L. polychotoma.

References

Prehistoric insect genera
Neuroptera genera
Fossil taxa described in 2011
Insects described in 2011
Jurassic insects
Insects of China